The County of Karkarooc is one of the 37 counties of Victoria which are part of the cadastral divisions of Australia, used for land titles. It is located to the south of the Murray River, with its western boundary at 142°E, and its eastern boundary at 143°E. Its southern boundary is on the 36°S parallel. Lake Tyrrell is located near the eastern boundary. Mildura is located near the north-western edge.

Parishes 
Parishes include:
 Annuello, Victoria
 Ballapur, Victoria
 Baring, Victoria
 Beulah, Victoria
 Bimbourie, Victoria
 Bitchigal, Victoria
 Bitterang, Victoria
 Boigbeat, Victoria
 Boolungal, Victoria
 Boorong, Victoria
 Boorongie, Victoria
 Boulka, Victoria
 Bourka, Victoria
 Brockie, Victoria
 Bumbang, Victoria
 Burnell, Victoria
 Burupga, Victoria
 Byanga, Victoria
 Cambacanya, Victoria
 Cantala, Victoria
 Carool, Victoria
 Carori, Victoria
 Carwarp, Victoria
 Chiprick, Victoria
 Cocamba, Victoria
 Colignan, Victoria
 Cronomby, Victoria
 Curyo, Victoria
 Dattuck, Victoria
 Daytrap, Victoria
 Dennying, Victoria
 Dering, Victoria
 Dewry, Victoria
 Eureka, Victoria
 Gaalanungah, Victoria
 Galaquil, Victoria
 Gama, Victoria
 Gayfield, Victoria
 Geera, Victoria
 Gingimrick, Victoria
 Gorya, Victoria
 Goyura, Victoria
 Gutchu, Victoria
 Jil Jil, Victoria
 Kallery, Victoria
 Karyrie, Victoria
 Kenmare, Victoria
 Kia, Victoria
 Kinabulla, Victoria
 Koimbo, Victoria
 Konardin, Victoria
 Kooroop, Victoria
 Kulkyne, Victoria
 Kulwin, Victoria
 Kurdgweechee, Victoria
 Larundel, Victoria
 Lascelles, Victoria
 Lianiduck, Victoria
 Liparoo, Victoria
 Lyngaller, Victoria
 Manangatang, Victoria
 Margooya, Victoria
 Marlbed, Victoria
 Merbein, Victoria
 Mildura, Victoria
 Minapre, Victoria
 Mittyack, Victoria
 Mittyan, Victoria
 Moah, Victoria
 Moortworra, Victoria
 Mournpoul, Victoria
 Myall, Victoria
 Nandemarriman, Victoria
 Natya, Victoria
 Nenandie, Victoria
 Nowingi, Victoria
 Nulkwyne, Victoria
 Nurnurnemal, Victoria
 Nyallo, Victoria
 Nypo, Victoria
 Ouyen, Victoria
 Paignie, Victoria
 Panitya, Victoria
 Patchewollock, Victoria
 Pier-Millan, Victoria
 Piro, Victoria
 Pullut, Victoria
 Raak, Victoria
 Thanni, Victoria
 Tiega, Victoria
 Timberoo, Victoria
 Toltol, Victoria
 Towma, Victoria
 Trinnta, Victoria
 Tungie, Victoria
 Tyenna, Victoria
 Tyrrell, Victoria
 Wagant, Victoria
 Walle, Victoria
 Walpamunda, Victoria
 Walpeup, Victoria
 Wangry, Victoria
 Watchupga, Victoria
 Wathe, Victoria
 Wemen, Victoria
 Whirily, Victoria
 Wiall, Victoria
 Wilhelmina, Victoria
 Willangie, Victoria
 Winnambool, Victoria
 Wirmbirchip, Victoria
 Wirmbool, Victoria
 Wirrbibial, Victoria
 Woornack, Victoria
 Wortongie, Victoria
 Wymlet, Victoria
 Wyperfeld, Victoria
 Yaapeet, Victoria
 Yallum, Victoria
 Yarrum, Victoria
 Yelwell, Victoria

References
Vicnames, place name details
Research aids, Victoria 1910
Map of the counties of Millewa, Karkarooc, Tatchera and Weeah showing colony and parish boundaries, main roads, telegraph lines and railways.  1886. National Library of Australia

Counties of Victoria (Australia)